Agnes Eleonora Augusta Emilia de Frumerie (November 20, 1869 – April 2, 1937) was a Swedish artist who spent much of her career in France.

She was born Agnes Eleonora Augusta Emilia Kjellberg in Skövde and studied at the Royal Swedish Academy of Fine Arts in Stockholm from 1886 to 1890. She lived in Paris from 1892 to 1923, where she studied with Rodin. She produced mainly smaller sculptures and ceramics. She married Gustaf de Frumerie, a captain in the Swedish army and later a doctor, in Paris. During the 1890s, she became part of the avant-garde group of artists in Paris, including August Strindberg whose image she captured in a sculpture. She also worked in collaboration with Edmond Lachenal.

De Frumerie died in Stockholm at the age of 67.

Selected work

References

Further reading

External links
 

1869 births
1937 deaths
Swedish ceramists
Swedish women sculptors
Swedish women ceramists
19th-century Swedish sculptors
20th-century Swedish sculptors
Swedish people of Walloon descent
Agnes de